W. H. Lawrence may refer to:
Bill Lawrence (news personality)  (1916—1972), American journalist
Washington H. Lawrence (1840-1900), founder of National Carbon Company and Eveready Battery Company